Biology of Reproduction is a peer-reviewed scientific journal and the official journal of the Society for the Study of Reproduction. It is published with the assistance of Oxford University Press. According to the Journal Citation Reports, the journal has a 2020 impact factor of 4.285, ranking it 5th out of 29 journals in the category "Reproductive Biology".

References

External links 
 

Developmental biology journals
English-language journals
Publications established in 1969
Monthly journals
Academic journals published by learned and professional societies